Akola West Assembly constituency is one of the 288 Vidhan Sabha (Legislative Assembly) constituencies of Maharashtra state in western India. This constituency is located in the Akola district.

Akola is part of the Akola Lok Sabha constituency along with five other Vidhan Sabha segments, namely Akot, Akola East, Balapur and Murtizapur in this district and Risod in adjoining Washim district.

As per orders of Delimitation of Parliamentary and Assembly constituencies Order, 2008, No. 30 Akola West Assembly constituency is composed of the following: 
Akola Tehsil (Part) - Akola (M.Corp.) (Part), Ward No 1 to 7,13 to 30, 38 to 53 and 56 to 65 of the district.

Members of Legislative Assembly

Election results

2019

See also
 Akola
 List of constituencies of Maharashtra Vidhan Sabha

References

Assembly constituencies of Maharashtra
Akola